The 7.7 cm Kanone in Haubitzlafette (7.7 cm gun on howitzer carriage) was a field gun used by Germany in World War I. It consisted of the barrel of the 7.7 cm FK 96 n.A. mounted on the carriage of the 10.5 cm Feldhaubitze 98/09 in an attempt to get more elevation and range than the old 7.7 cm FK 96 n.A.. The Allies captured one example on 17 April 1916, but it is uncertain just how many were made or if they remained in service once the 7.7 cm FK 16 was introduced.  The problem of range was addressed in the 7.7 cm FK 16 by adopting a longer barrel, increasing the size of the propellant chamber, changing the rifling pattern and increasing the elevation of the carriage.

References 

 

World War I artillery of Germany
77 mm artillery